PTX is the second studio album by American a cappella band Pentatonix. Released on 19 September 2014 via RCA Records, the work contains songs from PTX Volumes 1 & 2, cover songs from YouTube and seven new Pentatonix songs.

Track listing

Charts

References 

2014 albums
Pentatonix albums
RCA Records albums